Moral Code of the Builder of Communism was a set of twelve codified moral rules in the Soviet Union which every member of the Communist Party of the USSR and every Komsomol member were supposed to follow.

The Moral Code was adopted at the 22nd Congress of the Communist Party of the Soviet Union in 1961, as part of the new Third Program.

The very first moral principle was "Devotion to the cause of communism".

Its twelve rules may be superficially compared to the Ten Commandments, but they overlap only marginally (although in Russian-speaking books and media one may sometimes see the claims about foundations in the Bible, referring to, e.g., "he who does not work, neither shall he eat" (2 Thessalonians 3:10); also used in the 1936 Soviet Constitution). Unlike the Ten Commandments, however, the rules of the Code were not concrete rules of conduct; they were stated as the rules of attitude. For example, "You shall not commit adultery" of Moses loosely corresponds to "Mutual respect in a family, concern about the upbringing of children" of the Code.

Another notable distinction is that the Moral Code speaks in terms of the relation of a person to the society, rather than in terms of personal virtues. For example, the "Do not steal" may be loosely matched to "Concern of everyone about the preservation and multiplication of the common wealth".

Russian legislator and Communist Party leader Gennady Zyuganov compared the moral code of the builder of communism to the Sermon on the Mount.

Twelve rules of the Builder of Communism 
Here are the commandments which were written as a part of the Third Party Programme:
 Loyalty to Communism, and love of the socialist Motherland and other socialist countries.
 Conscious work for the good of the society: One who doesn't work, doesn't get to eat.
 Care for the collective property, as well as the multiplying of this property.
 High consciousness of the social responsibilities, and intolerance to the violation of the social interests.
 Collectivism and comradery: All for one and one for all.
 Humane relationships between human beings: One human being is a friend, a comrade and a brother to another human being.
 Honesty, ethical cleanliness, as well as simplicity and modesty both in private and public life.
 Mutual respect in the family, and care for the upbringing of the children.
 Intolerance to the injustice, social parasitism, unfairness, careerism, and acquisitiveness.
 Friendship and brotherhood with all the nations of the USSR, intolerance to all racial and national dislike.
 Intolerance to the enemies of communism, peace and freedom of peoples of the world.
 Brotherly solidarity to all workers of all countries and nations.

See also
 Prussian virtues
 Eight Honors and Eight Shames

References

Documents of the Communist Party of the Soviet Union
Soviet culture
Codes of conduct
1961 documents